Beaumont Herald of Arms Extraordinary is an officer of arms extraordinary in England.  Beaumont is a royal herald, but is not a member of the College of Arms. The office was created in 1982 and named after the barony of Beaumont, one of the subsidiary titles of the Earl Marshal, the Duke of Norfolk. The badge of office combines the cross potent of the Kings of Jerusalem from whom the Beaumonts are descended, with the lion and fleur-de-lis charges from the family coat of arms. It is blazoned In front of a Cross Potent a Lion rampant within eight Fleurs-de-lis in orle Or.

Holders of the office

See also
 Heraldry
 Officer of Arms

References
Citations

Bibliography
 The College of Arms, Queen Victoria Street : being the sixteenth and final monograph of the London Survey Committee, Walter H. Godfrey, assisted by Sir Anthony Wagner, with a complete list of the officers of arms, prepared by H. Stanford London, (London, 1963)
 A History of the College of Arms &c, Mark Noble, (London, 1804)

External links
The College of Arms
CUHGS Officer of Arms Index

English offices of arms